Natalia Medvedeva and Natasha Zvereva were the defending champions, but Zvereva did not compete. Medvedeva played with Natalia Biletskaia but lost in the quarterfinals to Amy Frazier and Luanne Spadea.

Jo-Anne Faull and Rachel McQuillan defeated Alexia Dechaume and Emmanuelle Derly in the final, 4–6, 6–2, 6–3 to win the girls' doubles tennis title at the 1988 Wimbledon Championships.

Seeds
The top 4 seeds received a bye into the second round.

  Alexia Dechaume /  Emmanuelle Derly (final)
  Jo-Anne Faull /  Rachel McQuillan (champions)
  Jana Pospíšilová /  Radka Zrubáková (quarterfinals)
  Amy Frazier /  Luanne Spadea (semifinals)
  Ann Grossman /  Meredith McGrath (semifinals)
  Michelle Bowrey /  Kristine Radford (quarterfinals)
  Julie Halard /  Maïder Laval (quarterfinals)
  Natalia Biletskaia /  Natalia Medvedeva (quarterfinals)

Draw

Finals

Top half

Bottom half

References

External links

Girls' Doubles
1988